The 
Uttarakhand movement refers to the events of statehood activism within the undivided state of Uttar Pradesh which ultimately resulted in the formation of Uttarakhand, India as a separate state. Uttarakhand became a state on 9 November 2000. The formation of Uttarakhand was achieved after a long struggle and many sacrifices. The demand to make Uttarakhand a state was first raised at a special session of the Indian National Congress held in Srinagar on 5-6 May 1938. The demand gradually strengthened following a series of events. In 1994, the demand for a separate state eventually took the form of mass movement that resulted in the formation of India's 27th state by 2000.
Jeet Bahadur Gurung is the first martyr in Pauri on 8 August 1994.

History
The important dates and events that played a key role in the struggle for the formation of the Uttarakhand state are:

 As a unit of Indian independence movement in 1913, the national general convention of the Indian National Congress was held in Uttarakhand. Most representatives from Uttarakhand participated in the session. The same year in Uttarakhand, Tamta Sudharini Sabha held the convention for the upliftment of backwards and oppressed people of the area, as the Shilpkar Mahasabha.
 In September 1916, the Kumaon Parishad was founded by some young enthusiasts—mainly Pt Hargovind Vallabh Pant, Govind Ballabh Pant, Badri Datt Pandey, Indralal Shah, Mohan Singh Damarwal Chandra Lal Shah Prem Ballabh Pandey, Bhola Datt Pandey and Lakshmi Datt Shastri—with the main objective to solve social and economic problems of the hill region. By 1916, in addition to the local general reforms, certain political objectives were added to the organization's goals. In the Provincial elections of 1923 and 1926 the candidates of Kumaon Parishad, Hargovind Vallabh Pant, Govind Vallabh Pant, Mukundi Lal and Badri Datt Pandey badly defeated their counterparties.
 In 1926 Kumaon Parishad was merged in the Indian National Congress.
 In May 1938, according to official sources in the British Raj, in the national general convention of Indian National Congress held at Srinagar, Garhwal, Pandit Jawaharlal Nehru favoured the cause of the movement of the residents of hill region to have their own decisions according to their circumstances and supported the movement to enrich their culture.
 In 1940, at Haldwani conference, Badri Datt Pandey voiced for the special status of the mountainous region. Anusuya Prasad Bahuguna proposed the formation of Kumaon - Garhwal as the separate units. In 1954 the Uttar Pradesh Legislative Council member Indra Singh Nayal demanded the separate development plan for the highlands to then Chief Minister of Uttar Pradesh, Govind Ballabh Pant. In 1955 the Justice Fazal Ali commission recommended the Government of India, formation of hill region as a separate state.
 In the year 1957, deputy chairman of the Planning Commission, T. T. Krishnamachari suggested special attention be given to the issues of the hill region. On 12 May 1970, then Prime Minister Indira Gandhi addressed the issues of hill region and admitted that the diagnosis of the problems of hill region is the responsibility of both State and Central Governments. On 24 July 1979, the Uttarakhand Kranti Dal was founded in Mussoorie with the objective of the formation of a separate hill state. In June 1987 at the party convention of UKD in Karnaprayag, party leaders called for the constitution of conflict and isolation. In November 1987 UKD passed the party resolution for the formation of the new state in the memorandum and the party president also sought to include Haridwar in the proposed state.
 Throughout the year 1994, students all over the region participated in the collective movement for separate statehood and reservations. Uttarakhand movement than further intensified in the field by Anti-Uttarakhand statement of then Chief Minister of Uttar Pradesh, Mulayam Singh Yadav. The leaders of UKD held fast-unto-death in the support of their demand for a separate state. State government employees struck work for three months, and the events of the Uttarakhand movement got more intensified with the blockades and confrontation with the police. Uttarakhand activists in Mussoorie and Khatima were shot down by the police. Under the aegis of the, Samyukta Morcha on 2 October 1994 the massive demonstrations and protests for the support of statehood took place in the national capital Delhi. Thousands of Uttarakhand activists marched to Delhi to participate in this struggle. The activists peacefully taking part in the demonstration near Rampur Tiraha crossing, Muzaffarnagar were tortured and openly fired without any warning prior to the firing. Policemen were also alleged for indecent behavior and rapes with women activists. Satya Pokhriyal was leader who leads all the people from the mishappening, other andolankari help other people and shows the bravery. Several people were killed and many were injured. This misadventure by the police added fuel to the fire for the Uttarakhand movement. The next day 3 October, the protests were called off for the demolition of firing and several deaths all over the region.
 In March 1994, the Uttar Pradesh Chief Minister Mulayam Singh Yadav deeded to implement the Mandal Commission recommendation of reserving 27 per cent jobs in government and places in schools and colleges for socially and economically backward castes and classes. The Hills had a negligible OBC population of 2.5%. Reserving the seat for OBC meant all Govt seats going to the plains of Uttar Pradesh. It resulted in the intensification of the statehood protests. 
 7 October 1994, a female activist died after the brutal attack by police in Dehradun while she was protesting against Rampur Tiraha Firings, and the activists in return stormed the police station.
 15 October, curfew took in Dehradun and one activist was killed on the same day.
 27 October 1994, then Home Minister of India, Rajesh Pilot held the talks with the statehood activists. Meanwhile, at Sriyantra Tapu, Srinagar several activists were killed in a brutal attack by the police.
 15 August 1996, then Prime Minister H. D. Deve Gowda announced the formation of new state Uttaranchal from the Red Fort, Delhi.
 in 1998 the BJP-led coalition government in the center sent the 'Uttaranchal Bill' to the Government of Uttar Pradesh through the President of India. With 26 amendments the Uttaranchal Bill was passed by the Uttar Pradesh Assembly and sent back to the Central Government. The Central Government on 27 July 2000, presented the Uttar Pradesh Reorganisation Bill 2000 in the Parliament of India. It was passed by Lok Sabha on 1 August 2000, and the Rajya Sabha passed the bill on 10 August 2000. Then President of India, K. R. Narayanan approved the Uttar Pradesh Reorganisation Bill, on 28 August 2000, and then it turned into Act and on 9 November 2000 the new state Uttaranchal came into existence as the 27th state of India now known as Uttarakhand.

Events of the movement
There were several violent incidents in the Uttarakhand movement which are:

Khatima firing case 
On 1 September 1994, police opened fire on activists that resulted in the death of seven activists. This resulted in anger and mass agitation of people and youth Students. Vijay Joshi S/o BB Joshi from Tanakpur intensified till 1995 and led a mass rally from Kumaon hills, Muzaffarnagar, Kotdwar to Delhi.

Mussoorie firing case 
On 2 September 1994, to protest against the police action in the Khatima firing, a march was taken out in Mussoorie. At Jhulaghar, the constabulary opened fire on protestors leading to the death of Belmati Chauhan, Hansa Dhanai, Balbir Singh, Rai Singh Bangari, Madan Mamgain and Dhanpat Singh and Circle Officer Uma Kant Tripathi. Apart from them, some eighteen people were treated for bullet injuries.

Rampur Tiraha (Muzaffarnagar) firing case 

The activists, part of the agitation for the separate state of Uttarakhand, were going to Delhi to stage a dharna, a sit-in protest at Raj Ghat on Gandhi Jayanti. The following day, when alleged unprovoked police firing during the night of 1 October led to the death of six activists, and some women were allegedly brutally raped and molested in the ensuing melee. Mulayam Singh Yadav was Chief Minister of Uttar Pradesh when the incident occurred.
Eight policemen, including three Inspectors were proven guilty and prosecuted in the resulting case.

Dehradun firing case 
The incident occurred on 3 October 1994 in Muzaffarnagar near Dehradun. The people were expected to be fierce. The situation following the funeral of Martyr Late Ravindra Rawat resulted in fierce battles between the police and protesters in the entire Dehradun. The police who were already prepared to suppress the uprising in any eventuality resorted to firing, which killed three people.

Late Rajesh Rawat's death was alleged to have been a result of firing from the house of then Samajwadi Party leader Suryakant Dhasmana.

Kotdwar case 
On 3 October 1994, the whole of Uttarakhand was boiled in protest against the Rampur Tiraha incident and the police administration was ready to suppress it by any means. In this episode, there was also a movement in Kotdwar, in which two agitators were beaten to death by policemen with rifle butt strokes and sticks.

Nainital firing case 
The protest was at its peak in Nainital too, but due to its leadership being in the hands of intellectuals, the police could not do anything, but they took out their anger on Pratap Singh, who worked in Hotel Pacific. RAF soldiers pulled him from the hotel and when he ran towards the hotel Meghdoot to escape, he was shot in the neck and killed.

Sriyantra Tapu (Srinagar) case 
Activists started fast unto death on 7 November 1994, at Sriyantra Tapu situated near Srinagar, against these repressive actions and for the demand for the formation of a new state Uttarakhand. On 10 November 1994, the police climbed the island and caused havoc. Many people were injured badly. In the series of events, police attacked two young men using the lathi and hit them with the butt strokes of their guns. Police then threw those men into the river Alaknanda and hit them repeatedly with stones, resulting in the death of both activists.

Their bodies were not recovered by police for 15 days. The chairman of the ex-serviceman group (Virendra Prasad Kukshal) heard about the incident he began fast unto death for 7 days, due to this Government agencies started the search and recovered the bodies.
On 14 November 1994 the two dead bodies were found floating in the Alaknanda river near Bagwan.

See also 
 History of Uttarakhand

References

External links 
 Uttarakhand movement martyrs and activists
 Reasons of the formation of Uttarakhand state
 Collection of the review notes on the establishment of new state Uttarakhand
Hill state was carved out after 70 yrs of struggle

History of Uttarakhand (1947–present)
Reorganisation of Indian states